Roderick, Rodrick or Roderic (Proto-Germanic *Hrōþirīks, from *hrōþiz "fame, glory" + *ríks "king, ruler") is a  Germanic name, recorded from the 8th century onward. Its Old High German forms are Hrodric, Chrodericus, Hroderich, Roderich, Ruodrich (etc.); in Gothic language Hrōþireiks; in Old English language it appears as Hrēðrīc or Hroðrīc, and in Old Norse as Hrǿríkʀ (Old East Norse Hrø̄rīkʀ, Rø̄rīkʀ,  Old West Norse as Hrœrekr, Rœrekr). 

Rurik. In Spanish and Portuguese, it was rendered as Rodrigo, or in its short form, Ruy, Rui, or Ruiz, and in Galician, the name is Roi. In Arabic, the form Ludhriq (لذريق), used to refer Roderic (Ulfilan Gothic *Hroþareiks), the last king of the Visigoths. Saint Roderick (d. 857) is one of the Martyrs of Córdoba.

The modern English name does not continue the Anglo-Saxon form but was re-introduced from the continent by the Normans. The Middle English given name had also virtually disappeared by the 19th century, even though it had survived as a surname. The given name was re-popularised  by Sir Walter Scott's poem The Vision of Don Roderick (1811), where Roderick refers to the Visigothic king. The modern English name is sometimes abbreviated to Roddy.

Roderick is also an Anglicisation of several unrelated names. As a surname and given name it is used as an anglicised form of the Welsh Rhydderch. The given name Roderick is also used as an anglicised form of the Gaelic personal name Ruaidhrí/Ruairí/Ruairidh/Ruaraidh.

Medieval period
Hreðric, king Hroðgar's son in Beowulf, who has various counterparts named Rørik and Hrœrekr in Norse mythology
Hrœrekr Ringslinger (Rørik Slængeborræ or Rørik Slyngebond), mythological king in what is today Denmark. Father of Queen Gertrude, the prototype of Shakespeare's Prince Hamlet, possibly mixed up with the Viking founder of Novgorod and the Kyivan Rus’, Rurik; or the same person.
Roderic,   8th-century king of the Visigoths in Visigothic Kingdom of Spain.
Rorik of Dorestad, chieftain who ruled Frisia, in the 9th century
Rurik, 9th-century founder of Novgorod and the Kievan Rus, known as Hrøríkr of Holmgard, in Norse literature, Varangian viking King.
Saint Roderick (d. 857), one of the Martyrs of Córdoba.
Rodrigo Díaz de Vivar (c. 1043–1099), better known as El Cid, or simply Rodrigo, was a Castilian nobleman and military leader in medieval Spain.
S Uciredor ("Rodericus" spelled backwards), Medieval composer

Modern given name
See also: 

Roderick "Rod" Emery (born 1954), Afro-AMERICAN AUTHOR
Roderick Anderson (born 1972), American basketball player
Roderick Beaton, British Hellenist
Roderick Bowe, Bahamian military officer and the 6th commodore of the Royal Bahamas Defence Force 
Roderic "Rod" Brind'Amour (born 1970), Canadian ice hockey player
Roderick Chadwick (born 1978), England classical pianist
Roderick Chisholm (1916–1999), American philosopher
Roderick Coyne (born 1945), English artist, sculptor
Roderick Firth (1917–1987), Professor of Philosophy at Harvard University
Roderick "Roddy" Frame (born 1964), Scottish singer, songwriter and musician
Roderic Hill (1894-1954), senior Royal Air Force commander, one of the principal commanders of Operation Steinbock and 1936–1939 Arab revolt in Palestine
Roderick Hunt, British children's author
Roderick Johnson (born 1995), American football player
Roderick Lewis (born 1971), American football player
Roderick MacKinnon (born 1956), professor of Molecular Neurobiology and Biophysics at Rockefeller University
Roderick Murchison (1792–1871), Scottish geologist who first described and investigated the Silurian system
Roderick R. Allen (1894–1970), Major General in the United States Army
Roderick R. Butler (1827-1902), American politician
Roddy Ricch (born 1998), real name Roderick Wayne Moore Jr., American rapper
Roderick "Rory" Bremner (b. 1961), British impressionist
Roderick Stewart (born 1945) Singer/songwriter
Roderick Strong (born 1983), American professional wrestler
Roderick Toombs or Roddy Piper (1954–2015), Canadian retired professional wrestler and film actor
Roderick Watson (born 1943), Scottish poet, born in Aberdeen
Roderick Williams (born 1965), English operatic baritone

Fictional characters
Rodrick Heffley, a fictional character in the children's book series Diary of a Wimpy Kid.
Roderick Random, protagonist of the 1748 novel The Adventures of Roderick Random, by Tobias Smollett
Roderick Spode, recurring fictional character from the Jeeves novels of British comic writer P. G. Wodehouse
Roderick Usher, from Edgar Allan Poe's short story The Fall of the House of Usher.

Modern surname
Aaron Roderick (born 1972), wide receivers coach for the University of Utah Utes football team
Brande Roderick (born 1974), American model and actress
Buckley Roderick (1862–1908), Welsh solicitor, international rugby union forward and a Vice-Consular for Spain
Caerwyn Roderick (1927–2011), British Labour Party politician
Casey Roderick (born 1992), American stock car racing driver
David Roderick (born 1970), award-winning American poet, Assistant Professor at the University of North Carolina at Greensboro
George H. Roderick (1880–1963), official in the United States Department of the Army during the Eisenhower Administration
Jane Roderick, British slalom canoeist who competed in the early 1980s
John Roderick (American football), former professional American football wide receiver
John Roderick (correspondent) (1914–2008), American journalist, foreign correspondent for the Associated Press news service
John Roderick (musician), American musician and writer
Judy Roderick (1942–1992), American blues singer and songwriter
Libby Roderick, American singer/songwriter, recording artist, poet, activist, and teacher
Matt Von Roderick (born 1974), American trumpeter, singer and recording artist
Myron Roderick (1934–2011), American wrestler
Philip Roderick, British Anglican priest, founder of the Quiet Garden Movement
Richard Roderick (died 1756), British editor and poet
Rick Roderick (1949–2002), American professor of philosophy

Other
Roderick, favorite horse of Nathan Bedford Forrest, Confederate general in the American Civil War
 Kenneth Roderick O'Neal (1908–1989), African-American architect
Spencer Buford House, historic house listed on the NRHP in Williamson County, Tennessee, known also as Roderick for Nathan Bedford Forrest's horse
Roderick (novel), 1980 science fiction novel by John Sladek
16194 Roderick (2000 AJ231), main-belt asteroid

See also
Roderic
Rodrick (disambiguation)
Rodrigo
Rodriguez (surname)
Rurik
Broderick
Germanic names

References

External links
Lexikon över urnordiska personnamn

English masculine given names
Surnames
Given names
German masculine given names